"Windowlicker" is a song by British electronic musician Aphex Twin, released on 22 March 1999 as a single by Warp Records. The artwork for the single was created by Chris Cunningham, with additional work by The Designers Republic. Cunningham also directed the song's music video, which was nominated for the Brit Award for Best British Video.

The song peaked at number 16 on the UK Singles Chart, and was later voted by fans as Warp Records' most popular song for its 2009 Warp20 compilation. Pitchfork included the song at number 12 on their list Top 200 Tracks of the 90s.

Music

Characteristics
"Windowlicker" has been described variously as "uncompromising cyborg R&B", "hip-hop written in the language of glitches", and "eerie lounge-porn music"; the track's "sleazy, erotic ambiance connote[s] images and emotions alien to James' previous compositions." Heavily digitally processed and rhythmically rearranged breakbeats prominently appear in the song's backing track. Gasps, vocal harmonies and moans reminiscent of sexual vocal tones "glide in and out of the production"; it has been speculated that, like in many of James' productions from the late 1990s, the vocals are his own. The track consists of various sections, including a drum'n'bass intro, a "gooey middle section", and an abrasive noise ending, as well as featuring consistent melodic elements throughout.

In 2012, Pitchfork stated that the track's futuristic elements presaged various musical developments, including "Flying Lotus' digital deconstruction, James Blake's bent vocals, [and] the wobble and knock of dubstep". Similarly, Stereogum stated that "the song's mix of unpredictable syncopation, digital-dub alien transformations, errant noises, and bursts of melody would serve as a starting block for much of today's electronic music". Additionally, Daft Punk credited "Windowlicker" as an influence on the direction of their stylistic approach on their 2001 album Discovery.

Spectrogram 

A spectrogram of "Windowlicker" reveals a spiral at the end of the song. This spiral is more impressive when viewed with an X-Y scatter graph, X and Y being the amplitudes of the L and R channels, which shows expanding and contracting concentric circles and spirals.

The effect was achieved through use of the Mac-based program MetaSynth. This program allows the user to insert a digital image as the spectrogram. MetaSynth will then convert the spectrogram to digital sound and "play" the picture. According to an article on the website Wired News, photographs run through the program tend to produce "a kind of discordant, metallic scratching".

A logarithmic spectrogram of "" (commonly known as 'Equation' or 'Formula') reveals a portrait of James' face near the end of the track, grinning.

Single release 
The "Windowlicker" single contains its title track and two B-sides. Track two, commonly known as "[Formula]", "[Equation]", or, as translated on the Japanese edition, "[Symbol]", due to its actual title being a complex mathematical formula (""), has a very experimental sound. Track three, "Nannou", dedicated to his then-girlfriend, is made up of wind-up music box samples.

As of 2001, "Windowlicker" has sold over 300,000 copies.

Music video 

The music video for "Windowlicker" was directed by Chris Cunningham, who had also directed Aphex Twin's previous music video, "Come to Daddy". It is a ten-minute long parody of contemporary American gangsta hip-hop music videos. In the video, two foul-mouthed young men in Los Angeles are window shopping for women; the French term for window shopping is faire du lèche-vitrine, which literally translates to "licking the windows"; "window licker" and "window licking" are pejorative British English terms. They come across two women (referred to in the end credits as "hoochies") who repeatedly turn down their advances. Suddenly, a ridiculously long white limousine (38 windows in length, including the driver's window, which takes 20 seconds to fully display) crashes into the two men's black Mazda Miata NA (MX5) convertible, and a "pimped-out" Richard D. James, displaying a hyperbolic amount of wealth and power, emerges with his signature fixed grin, at which point the song begins. After emerging from the limousine, James begins provocatively dancing with an umbrella bearing the Aphex Twin logo in an attempt to seduce the two women. The women then accompany James in his limousine while their faces morph into James' own likeness. When they emerge from the limousine's sunroof, the young men try to woo them again but fail. The men arrive at an area where James and a group of women bearing his face are dancing together, and they receive leis from two of the women. Their attention is eventually drawn to a dancing woman turned away from them, but she turns around to reveal a horrifically ugly, buck-toothed, deformed face (which was later illustrated in a sketch by Swiss artist H. R. Giger titled "The Windowlickers"), much to the men's horror. The video ends with James' women dancing on Santa Monica Beach while James pops and sprays a bottle of champagne.

James' faces aren't digitally morphed on the women. Masks and make-up were specifically designed by the production, to achieve the desired morphing effect. The cast for the dialogue intro of the clip are Marcus Morris, Gary Cruz, Marcy Turner and Chiquita Martin. Filming was done in the Los Angeles area. The locations are as follows:
 Intro sequence – East 1st Street (bridge over railroad tracks)
 Aphex Twin dance sequence – Corner of Ducommun Street and North Vignes Street
 Limo ride externals – Beverly Boulevard
 Final dance sequence – Santa Monica Beach (Barnard Way and Ocean Park Boulevard)
There are 127 uses of profanity in the dialogue segment of the video (which is under 4 minutes), including 44 uses of the word "fuck". This averages to more than one use of profanity every two seconds. The video was released as a VHS single, containing both uncut and censored versions (the latter being referred to as the "Bleep Version"). It was also nominated for the Best Video award at the BRIT Awards 2000, alongside videos by Supergrass, The Chemical Brothers, Fatboy Slim, and eventual winner Robbie Williams.

The full "Windowlicker" video is restricted to being broadcast only during the nighttime on most music television channels. A bleeped-out version of the video exists, and MTV Two even made a daytime version, with all the opening dialogue removed (the censored version starts with the arrival of the limousine), along with some of its more graphic images. In 2008, MTV Networks Europe was fined by the United Kingdom's media regulator Ofcom for several breaches of its broadcasting code, including airing the uncensored version of the "Windowlicker" video on TMF in 2006 before the 9 PM watershed.

Reception 

"Windowlicker" received positive reviews from critics. AllMusic gave the EP 4/5 stars. The single was named NME's Single of the Year 1999 in its year-end charts. In September 2010, Pitchfork Media included the song at number 12 on their list Top 200 Tracks of the 90s.

Remixes and use in other media 
A remix of "Windowlicker" in the acid techno style, entitled "Windowlicker, Acid Edit", is available on the remix compilation 26 Mixes for Cash. Another remix of "Windowlicker", entitled "WINDuckyQuaCKer", appears on V/VM's HelpAphexTwin/1.0 (2001) and HelpAphexTwin 4.0 (2003). A remix entitled "it's a richJAMs World" appears on V/VM's HelpAphexTwin 4.0 (2003). Run Jeremy (an alias of Danish producer Anders Trentemøller) also made his own remix of "Windowlicker".
Beardyman performed a live version of "Windowlicker" as part of his Edinburgh show in 2009.

Miss Kittin performed Run Jeremy's remix of "Windowlicker live" at the Sónar festival and included it on her album Live at Sónar. Elements of "Windowlicker", including its heavily distorted outro, were sampled by American musician Girl Talk on his track "Get It Get It", from his 2010 album All Day.

The "Windowlicker" cover was featured in the 2000 film High Fidelity.

A. G. Cook made a "note-for-note" cover of Windowlicker in 2017 as part of the PC Music compilation Month of Mayhem.

"Windowlicker" is played almost in full in the 2018 Gaspar Noé film Climax,.

The ending section of "Windowlicker" is featured in the 2006 film Grandma's Boy.

Track listing 
All tracks written, produced and engineered by Richard D. James. The original single was released on 12-inch, two separate CDs, a special edition Japanese CD and VHS.

CD1 and 12-inch vinyl

CD2 

 The "Windowlicker" video is also included in QuickTime format.

Japanese version

Chart positions

References

External links 
 "Windowlicker" at the Warp Records website
 
 
 "Face the music" – from The Guardian Friday Review, 5 March 1999
 Spectrogram analysis of track 2 (The Aphex Face)

1999 singles
Music videos directed by Chris Cunningham
Aphex Twin songs
1999 songs
Warp (record label) singles
Songs written by Aphex Twin
Obscenity controversies in music